Mait Laas (born 4 August 1970 in Tallinn) is an Estonian animated film director, producer, scenarist and artist.

Filmography

 2008 "Aja meistrid" ('The Kings of the Time')
 2013 "Lisa Limone ja Maroc Orange: tormakas armulugu" ('Lisa Limone and Maroc Orange: A Rapid Love Story')
 2016 "Mees ja naine"

References

Living people
1970 births
Estonian animated film directors
Estonian film producers
Estonian illustrators
People from Tallinn